My Secret Passion: The Arias is the first classical album by Michael Bolton featuring the Philharmonia Orchestra under the direction of Steven Mercurio. The album includes a duet with Renée Fleming.

Due to lack of substantial promotion the album peaked on the Billboard Top 200 at an extremely low #112, marking the end of the period of chart success for Bolton.

Track listing
"Pourquoi me réveiller?" from Werther by Jules Massenet - 2:57
"Nessun dorma" from Turandot by Giacomo Puccini - 3:14
"Una furtiva lagrima" from L'elisir d'amore by Gaetano Donizetti - 4:52
"M'apparì" from Martha by Friedrich von Flotow - 3:08
"Che gelida manina" from La bohème by Giacomo Puccini - 4:49
"O soave fanciulla" from La bohème by Giacomo Puccini (Duet with Renée Fleming) - 4:26
"Vesti la giubba" from Pagliacci by Ruggero Leoncavallo - 3:14
"E lucevan le stelle" from Tosca by Giacomo Puccini - 3:17
"Recondita armonia" from Tosca by Giacomo Puccini - 2:24
"È la solita storia" from L'arlesiana by Francesco Cilea - 4:42
"Celeste Aïda" from Aïda by Giuseppe Verdi - 3:38

Credits 
 Producers – Grace Row and Michael Bolton
 Vocals produced by Michael Bolton and Dave Reitzas.
 Recorded by Rob Rapley at Abbey Road Studios (London, England), Passion Studios (Westport, CT), Record Plant (Los Angeles, CA) and Sony Music Studios (New York, NY).
 Mixed by Dave Reitzas at The Hit Factory (New York, NY).
 Mastered by Vlado Meller at Sony Music Studios.
 Design – Joel Zimmerman
 Illustration – Tom Woodruff
 Photography – Sheila Metzner

References

Michael Bolton albums
1998 albums

In Popular Culture

In season 5 of the sitcom “The Nanny” lead characters Fran and Maxwell go to launch party of this album on what winds up a disastrous date. Michael Bolton makes an appearance and performs “Nessun Dorma” in the episode.